Lister or Lyster is an English occupational surname, and may refer to a textile dyer, from the Middle English word "litster", meaning to dye.  It dates back to the 13th century in Scotland with the recording of Aleyn le Littester of Edinburghshire who rendered homage to the Interregnum government in 1296, and to the 14th century in England (Richard le Lyster appears in the Subsidy Tax Rolls of Derbyshire in 1327).

The name probably comes from the Old Norse verb 'lita', meaning 'to dye' and rendered as 'lystare' in English.  The noun for 'dyer' was 'litster' (Scottish), 'lit(t)e' (middle English), or 'lister' (English).  The word was also associated with a 'salmon spear', rendered 'lyster' (Danish) or 'lister' (English).  A 1533 Act of Parliament stated, "No person shall take in any crele, raw web, lister.... the young fry of salmon."

The name took hold in areas of England in the 16th century known for the woollen industry, mainly Yorkshire, but also Lancashire, Lincolnshire and Norfolk.

The name came to Ireland following the Cromwellian campaign of 1649, and took root in County Laois, rendered by the English as Queen's County.

Spelling variants
The name's spellings include Lister (English and Scottish), Lyster (Irish), Lester, Lestor (English), McInlester, McLeister, Laister, Litster (Scottish), Lidster (Scottish), and the rare Ledgister and Ledster (Scottish).

Eswyn Lyster notes that, "It is often said that 'Lister' is the English name, while 'Lyster' is Irish, but both spellings are found in Ireland, often in the same family.  In England 'Lyster' is seldom seen (save) to someone whose ancestors moved to Ireland and then returned.  In Scotland the spelling (Fife County) is 'Litster' and 'Lidster', and tends to become 'Lister' in modern times'."

Whereas both 'Lister' and 'Lyster' rhyme with 'mister', in some areas of western Canada 'Lyster' is rendered as if spelt 'Lester'.

Coat of arms and crest

There is no official registry that recognizes a Lister/Lyster coat of arms, but Listers of Yorkshire-descent use the one granted to John Lyster de Derby.  It is a shield divided horizontally in three, the middle being black with three large white five-pointed stars.  Six small staggered crosses with bell-bottomed bases are on the white strip at the top, and seven are on the bottom.

The crest which appears atop the coat of arms is a dagger impaling a laurel wreath, from Carlow Ireland (Queen's County).  This is listed in Fairburn's Crests, designated "LYSTER, Ire."

The family motto is variously 'Retinens vestigia famae' (Following in the footsteps of fame), or 'Facta, non verba' (Deeds, not words).

Lister
 Alton Lister, retired American professional basketball player
 Anne Lister, (1791–1840), Yorkshire landowner
 Anthony Lister, an Australian born painter and installation artist
 Arthur Lister, (1830–1908), English botanist
 Aynsley Lister, English blues guitarist
 Big Bill Lister, (1923–2009), Texas country and western singer, honkytonk singer
 Charles J. Lister, (1820–1912), a central figure in the Restoration Movement in 19th-century Canada
 Dave Lister (fictional character), character in the BBC television sitcom Red Dwarf
 David Cunliffe-Lister, 2nd Earl of Swinton
 David Lister (director), South African-born film director
 David Lister (origami historian)
 Dean Lister, an American mixed martial arts fighter and a former KOTC champion
 Elaine Lister (born 1962), Scottish wheelchair curler
 General Enrique Líster, Spanish Communist politician and military officer who took part in the Spanish Civil War and World War II
 Hovie Lister, musician
 Hugh Lister, (1901–1944), an Anglican priest, trade union organizer, and combatant officer in World War II
 Ensign Jeremy Lister, the youngest British officer at the Battle of Lexington and Concord
 Joseph Lister, British surgeon and pioneer of antiseptic surgery
 Joseph Jackson Lister (1786–1869), British amateur opticist and physicist; father of Joseph Lister
 Joseph Jackson Lister (naturalist) (1857–1927), British zoologist and plant collector
 Joseph Lister (VC), received VC for actions at the Third Battle of Ypres
 Martin Lister, (c. 1638 – 1712), English naturalist and physician
 Marquita Lister, American opera soprano
 Matthew Lister (died 1657)
 Moira Lister, British actress and writer
 Mosie Lister, U.S. musician
 Nicholas Cunliffe-Lister, 3rd Earl of Swinton
 Philip Cunliffe-Lister, 1st Earl of Swinton
 Richard Percival Lister, (R. P. Lister) British metallurgist, author, poet and painter
 S. E. Lister, British novelist
 Samuel Lister, 1st Baron Masham
 Steve Lister, English footballer
 Susan Cunliffe-Lister, Baroness Masham of Ilton
 Thomas Lister (regicide), (1597–1668), Colonel in English Parliamentary Army, English civil war
 Thomas Henry Lister, (1800–1842) English novelist and Registrar General
 Tom Lister, Jr. (1958–2020), American actor
 Tommy Lister Jr. (1958–2020), American character actor and wrestler
 W. Lister Lister (1859–1943), Australian artist

Lyster
 Anthony George Lyster (1852–1920), Engineer-in-Chief to the Mersey Docks and Harbour Board (1852–1920)
 Bill Lyster, sergeant Mentioned in Despatches with the Canadian Army, Dieppe Raid, Second World War
 Eswyn Lyster (1923–2009), Canadian author
 Harry Lyster (1830–1922), Anglo-Irish Victoria Cross winner and lieutenant general
 Lumley Lyster (1888–1957), Royal Navy vice-admiral during the Second World War
 Margery Lyster, English courtier and servant of Anne Boleyn
 Richard Lyster (1480–1554), English judge and Chief Justice of the King's Bench
 Theodore C. Lyster (1875–1933), US Army brigadier general and aviation medicine pioneer
 Thomas Lyster (Cavalier) (1612–1655), a supporter of King Charles I during the English Civil War
 Thomas William Lyster (1855–1922), Irish librarian; appears under his own name in Ulysses by James Joyce. 
 William Saurin Lyster (1828–1880), Irish-born impresario, active in Australia

Litster
 Geoffrey Litster, leader of a peasant uprising in Norfolk in 1381

See also
 Baron Lister, a British noble title that existed from 1897 to 1912
 Lester, related surname

Known Lister/Lyster histories
Lyster Pioneers of Lower Canada and the West, 1984  "The Lyster Family: The Canadian Lysters who Belong to the Lyster Family of Queen's County, Ireland", 1900 - James Lyster, Montreal, Canada
 Reverend Henry Littleton Lyster "Memorials of an Ancient House", 1913 - Sir Henry (Lyster) Denny (The Listers of Gisburn(e), Yorkshire, England)
 "The Lyster Family", 1973 - Helen Lyster Nash, Pasadena, California, USA. 1979. 275 pages. San Marino Printers, San Marino, CA HFG-Lyster-2. HFL 6677.
 Lyster Pioneers of Lower Canada and the West, 1984 - Eswyn Lyster, Qualicum Beach, British Columbia, Canada.  335 pages. Cartwright Printers, Courtenay, B.C. . HFG-Lyster-3.

References

English-language surnames